Ilhéu das Cabras is an uninhabited island in the Gulf of Guinea. It is one of the smaller islands of São Tomé and Príncipe. The islet is located about 2 km off the northeast coast of the island of São Tomé, 8 km north of the city centre of São Tomé. The islet consists of two hills, about 90 metres high. The islet was mentioned as "Mooro Caebres" in the 1665 map by Johannes Vingboons.

References

External links

Uninhabited islands of São Tomé and Príncipe
Água Grande District